Laos competed in the 2015 Southeast Asian Games from 5 to 16 June 2015.

Competitors

Medal summary

Medal by sport

Medal by Date

Medalists

Multiple Gold Medalists

References

External links

Nations at the 2015 Southeast Asian Games
2015
Southeast Asian Games
Southeast Asian Games